Union Sportive de la Médina d'El Harrach, known as USM El Harrach or simply USMH for short, is an Algerian football club based in El Harrach, a suburb of Algiers. The club was founded in 1935 as Union Sportive Musulmane Maison-Carréenne and its colours are yellow and black. Their home stadium, 1 November 1954 Stadium, has a capacity of 5,000 spectators. The club is currently playing in the Algerian Ligue 2.

Honours

Domestic competitions
Algerian Ligue Professionnelle 1
Champion (1): 1997–98

Algerian Cup
Winner (2): 1973–74, 1986–87

Managers
 Azzedine Aït Djoudi (July 1, 2000 – June 30, 2001)
 Khaled Lounici (2005–07)
 Nacer Bechouche (interim) (Oct 1, 2012 – April 1, 2013)
 Boualem Charef (July 1, 2011 – June 30, 2014)
 Abdelkader Yaïche (July 1, 2014–)

References

External links
 http://membres.lycos.fr/elkindinet/ 

 
Football clubs in Algeria
Football clubs in Algiers
Association football clubs established in 1935
Algerian Ligue Professionnelle 1 clubs
1935 establishments in Algeria
Sports clubs in Algeria